Giovanni Kasebacher (13 December 1910 – 4 June 1987) was an Italian cross-country skier who competed in the 1936 Winter Olympics.

In 1936 he was a member of the Italian relay team which finished fourth in the 4x10 km relay competition. In the 50 km event he finished 13th.

Further notable results were:
 1935: 1st, Italian men's championships of cross-country skiing, 46 km
 1936: 1st, Italian men's championships of cross-country skiing, 36 km

References

External links
 

1910 births
1987 deaths
Italian male cross-country skiers
Olympic cross-country skiers of Italy
Cross-country skiers at the 1936 Winter Olympics